Gulnare is a settlement in South Australia. At the 2006 census, Gulnare had a population of 95. The railway was built as narrow gauge in 1894 and converted to broad gauge in 1927. The railway had been closed by 1993.

The town of Gulnare was named for the Gulnare Plain. The plain was named by either John Horrocks or William Light. The name of Gulnare in Byron's Turkish Tales and the name of Colonel Light's ship Gulnare are both derived from an English spelling of Julnar the Sea-born in older English translations of the Arabian Nights.

References

Towns in South Australia
Mid North (South Australia)